Brecken is both a surname and a given name. Notable people with the name include:

Surname:
Frederick de St Croix Brecken (1828–1903), Prince Edward Island lawyer and politician
John Brecken (1800–1847), Prince Edward Island businessman and politician
John Brecken (died 1827), English-born United Empire Loyalist
Paul Brecken (1886–1960), Canadian politician
Ralph Brecken (1770–1813), Prince Edward Island businessman
Brecken Mellon 

Given name:
Brecken Palmer (born 1998), American actor

See also
Bracken (disambiguation)